Tecovas Creek is a creek in Potter County, Texas, USA. Its source is in Bushland, Texas, and it flows into the Canadian River. It is crossed by Farm Road 1061. It is located on the Frying Pan Ranch. The name comes from "techados," which means "roofed" in Spanish.

See also
List of rivers of Texas

References

Bodies of water of Potter County, Texas
Rivers of Texas